W. A. Young House, also known as the Young Place, is a historic home located near Salem, Dent County, Missouri.  It was built about 1871, and is an eclectic cruciform plan Late Victorian dwelling.  It features a Greek Revival style interior woodwork and 34 large, symmetrically arranged windows.

It was listed on the National Register of Historic Places in 1989.

References

Houses on the National Register of Historic Places in Missouri
Victorian architecture in Missouri
Houses completed in 1871
Buildings and structures in Dent County, Missouri
National Register of Historic Places in Dent County, Missouri